Calouros do Ar Futebol Clube, commonly known as Calouros do Ar, is a Brazilian football club based in Fortaleza, Ceará state. They competed in the Série B once.

History
The club was founded on January 1, 1952. Calouros do Ar won the Campeonato Cearense in 1955. They competed in the Série B in 1972, when they had a weak performance.

Achievements

 Campeonato Cearense:
 Winners (1): 1955

Stadium
Calouros do Ar Futebol Clube play their home games at Estádio Brigadeiro Médico José da Silva Porto. The stadium has a maximum capacity of 3,000 people.

References

Association football clubs established in 1952
Football clubs in Ceará
1952 establishments in Brazil